Rouvas is a former municipality in the Heraklion regional unit, Crete, Greece. Since the 2011 local government reform it is part of the municipality Gortyn, of which it is a municipal unit. Population 1,821 (2011). The seat of the municipality was in Gergeri.

References

Populated places in Heraklion (regional unit)